Sarah-Jayne Howard (born 3 July 1976) is a South African-born New Zealand dancer and choreographer.

Biography 
Howard was born in South Africa and emigrated to New Zealand with her family when she was five years old. The family settled in Stratford, Taranaki, where Howard grew up. She trained at the New Zealand School of Dance, and graduated with honours in 1995.

Howard danced for Meryl Tankard’s Australian Dance Theatre for four years and also choreographed two solo works for the company: Tonight and Veronique. She has also danced  in Australia with Garry Stewart’s company Thwack! and Gideon Obarzanek's Chunky Move Dance Company and choreographed for Company B.

In 2007, Howard received an Arts Foundation of New Zealand Laureate Award. In 2018, she was appointed associate artistic director at Australian Dance Theatre.

Personal life 
Howard and actor Nathan Page have two sons and live near Adelaide, Australia.

References 

1976 births
Living people
South African emigrants to New Zealand
21st-century New Zealand dancers
New Zealand choreographers
20th-century New Zealand dancers
New Zealand School of Dance alumni